Tsiolkovsky is a closed town in Amur Oblast, Russia, located on the Bolshaya Pyora River (a tributary of the Zeya),  from the border with China and  north of Blagoveshchensk, the administrative center of the oblast. Population:   The town serves the nearby spaceport, Vostochny Cosmodrome.

History
The town was founded in 1961. From 1969 to 1994, it was called Uglegorsk and was established in order to serve the nearby ICBM base of the Soviet Armed Forces which was code-named Svobodny-18. The closed status was assigned by the Decree of the Presidium of the Supreme Soviet of the RSFSR of October 19, 1965. In 1994 the entire complex was renamed to Uglegorsk.

In April 2013, President Vladimir Putin proposed to rename a town nearer to the Cosmodrome in honor of the founder of theoretical astronautics Konstantin Tsiolkovsky. Later it was decided to assign this name to Uglegorsk. In March 2014 the settlement held a public hearing where the majority of participants were in favor of the renaming. In June 2014 the Council of People's Deputies of Uglegorsk approved the name change. In September 2015 the deputies of the Legislative Assembly of Amur Oblast adopted a law to change the status of the settlement of Uglegorsk and transform it into a city without changing the established administrative borders. The official documents to rename the city were sent for examination to the Federal Service for State Registration, Cadastre and Cartography (Rosreestr). On December 23 the State Duma, the lower house of the Russian Parliament voted in favour of a federal law on the renaming of the town, and on December 30 President Putin signed it into law, thus formalizing the name changing.

On November 30, 2015, one of the streets of the town was renamed "3rd street of the Builders" as a tribute to the creativity of Eldar Ryazanov.

Administrative and municipal status
Within the framework of administrative divisions, it is incorporated as Uglegorsk Urban Okrug—an administrative unit with the status equal to that of the districts. As a municipal division, this administrative unit also has urban okrug status.

Economy and infrastructure
The settlement contains thirty-three blocks of residential homes and a boiler room. There is a secondary school, a children's arts school, two kindergartens, and a hospital. The settlement has a sports complex. Its construction began in 2005 and was planned to be finished by 2009 but due to lack of funding opening was postponed two years later to 2011.

Transportation
The Amur Highway (M58) also passes there.

Vostochny cosmodrome

In July 2010, Prime Minister Vladimir Putin announced that the area would be the site of a new Vostochny cosmodrome ("Eastern Spaceport"), to reduce Russian dependence on the Baikonur cosmodrome in Kazakhstan.

On early December 2011, a public debate held in Tsiolkovsky with the participation of officials from the Russian space industry in which the settlement's future in the context of the construction of the new cosmodrome was discussed. It was announced the south-eastern district will be expanded with six-, nine-, and twelve-story buildings designed for the settlement of 12,000 people. The buildings will be built using solid blocks which will be produced in a factory located at Svobodny south of Tsiolkovsky. The south-east neighborhood will be located on 140 acres near the old part of the settlement.

In late March 2012, it was reported that settlement residents are concerned with increase in crime, a situation the local population associates with a massive influx of temporary workers involved in the construction of infrastructure for the Cosmodrome. Many of the construction workers live in former military barracks, converted into a hostel.

References

Notes

Sources

Urban-type settlements in Amur Oblast
Populated places established in 1961
Closed cities